Theotima is a genus of small spiders in the family Ochyroceratidae.

Species
 Theotima elva Gertsch, 1977 (Mexico)
 Theotima fallax Fage, 1912 (Cuba, St. Vincent, Venezuela)
 Theotima galapagosensis Baert & Maelfait, 1986 (Galapagos Is.)
 Theotima jeanneli Machado, 1951 (Angola)
 Theotima kivuensis Machado, 1964 (Congo)
 Theotima lawrencei Machado, 1964 (Congo)
 Theotima makua Gertsch, 1973 (Hawaii)
 Theotima martha Gertsch, 1977 (Mexico)
 Theotima mbamensis Baert, 1985 (Cameroon)
 Theotima minutissima (Petrunkevitch, 1929) (tropical America, Asia, and Pacific Is.)
 Theotima mirabilis Machado, 1951 (Angola)
 Theotima moxicensis Machado, 1951 (Angola)
 Theotima pura Gertsch, 1973 (Mexico)
 Theotima radiata (Simon, 1891)  (Cuba, Puerto Rico, Venezuela)
 Theotima ruina Gertsch, 1977 (Mexico)
 Theotima tchabalensis Baert, 1985 (Cameroon)

References

Ochyroceratidae
Spiders of Africa
Spiders of North America
Spiders of Central America
Spiders of South America
Spiders of Oceania
Araneomorphae genera
Taxa named by Eugène Simon